Hiroko Sasaki is a pianist who performs in Europe, North America and Asia. At age 13, she began studying at the Yehudi Menuhin School in England.  Soon after, she made her European début. At 16, she entered the Curtis Institute in Philadelphia in the United States, where she studied with Leon Fleisher, graduating in 1994. She later earned a Master of Music degree with Fleisher from the Peabody Conservatory in Baltimore, and an Artist Diploma from the Royal Conservatory of Music in Toronto, Canada.

Sasaki continues to perform extensively as recitalist and chamber musician in England, Scotland, Taiwan, France, Hungary, Switzerland, Canada and the United States. She gives annual recitals in Carnegie’s Weill Hall and makes frequent tours of Japan. She is on the faculty of the Bard College Conservatory of Music in Annandale-on-Hudson, New York. She is a member of The Amadeus Trio, an American piano trio.

Discography
 Debussy : Preludes, Book I & II, Hiroko Sasaki – Pleyel 1873 (Piano Classics record label)

Her performance of works for piano by Claude Debussy on a restored Pleyel concert grand piano that existed at the time Debussy composed the works received a very positive review in The Guardian.

References

Date of birth missing (living people)
Living people
Curtis Institute of Music people
Japanese classical pianists
Japanese women pianists
Women classical pianists
21st-century Japanese pianists
Year of birth missing (living people)
People educated at Yehudi Menuhin School
21st-century Japanese women musicians
21st-century women pianists